Moses Point Airport  is an airport located in Elim, a city in the Nome Census Area of the U.S. state of Alaska. It is privately owned by the Elim Native Corporation. Formerly, the field operated as Moses Point Army Airfield during World War II.

Facilities and aircraft 
Moses Point Airport has one runway designated 6/24 with a gravel surface measuring 3,000 by 60 feet (914 x 18 m). The runway is badly eroded in spots and is not maintained in the winter. The airport is unattended. Prior permission for use is required from the Elim Native Corp. president or board.

For the 12-month period ending June 16, 1988, the airport had 3,510 aircraft operations, an average of 292 per month: 71% air taxi, 29% general aviation and <1% military.

See also 
 Elim Airport (IATA: ELI, ICAO: PFEL, FAA: ELI), a state-owned public-use airport located three nautical miles (6 km) southwest of the central business district of Elim.

References

External links 
 FAA Alaska airport diagram (GIF)

Airports in the Nome Census Area, Alaska
Native American airports